A by-election was held for the Australian House of Representatives seat of Balaclava on 16 July 1960. This was triggered by the resignation of Liberal MP Percy Joske. A by-election for the seat of Bendigo was held on the same day.

The by-election was won by Liberal candidate Ray Whittorn.

Results

References

1960 elections in Australia
Victorian federal by-elections
1960s in Victoria (Australia)
July 1960 events in Australia